Twin Lakes Township is one of sixteen townships in Calhoun County, Iowa, United States.  As of the 2000 census, its population was 1,434.

History
Twin Lakes Township was created in 1877. It takes its name from two lakes near the northeastern corner.

Geography
Part of the census-designated place of Twin Lakes occupies the northeast portion of the township, surrounding South Twin Lake. According to the USGS, the township contains one cemetery, Twin Lakes.

References

External links
 City-Data.com

Townships in Calhoun County, Iowa
Townships in Iowa